Charalambos may refer to:
Saint Charalambos (Greek: Άγιος Χαράλαμπος), early Christian bishop in Magnesia on the Maeander, a region of Asia Minor

Other notable people called Charalambos include:
Charalambos D. Aliprantis (1946–2009), Greek-American economist and mathematician
Charalambos Andreou (born 1967), former international Cypriot football striker
Charalambos Aristotelous (born 1995), Cypriot footballer
Charalambos Avgerinos, Greek politician, father of Nakis Avgerinos
Bambos Charalambous (Charalambos Charalambous, born 1967), British Member of Parliament
Charalambos Cholidis (born 1956), Greek former wrestler who competed in four Summer Olympics
Charalambos Christodoulou (born 1967), Cypriot football manager
Charalambos Dimarchopoulos (born 1964), Greek politician and mayor
Charalambos Giannopoulos (born 1989), Greek professional basketball player
Charalambos Katsimitros (1886–1962), Greek general during the Italian invasion of Greece
Charalambos Kyriakou (footballer, born 1989) (born 1989), Cypriot footballer
Charalambos Kyriakou (footballer, born 1995) (born 1995), Cypriot footballer
Charalambos Lykogiannis (born 1993), Greek footballer
Charalambos Markopoulos (born 1982), Greek professional basketball player and coach
Charalambos Moisiadis (born 1976), Greek footballer
Charalambos Oikonomopoulos (born 1991), Greek footballer
Charalambos Pachis (1844–1891), Greek painter of the Heptanese school
Charalambos Papadias (born 1975), retired Greek sprinter who specialized in the 100 metres
Charalambos Sarafoglou (born 1993), Greek footballer
Charalambos Siligardakis (born 1982), professional footballer
Charalambos Simopoulos (1874–1942), Greek diplomat, ambassador to London during the Second World War
Charalambos Tabasis (born 1986), retired Greek football player
Charalambos Theopemptou (born 1955), Greek Cypriot politician
Charalambos Tseroulis (1879–1929), Greek infantry officer, became Lieutenant General
Charalambos Vilaetis (1781–1821), Greek revolutionary leader
Charalambos Xanthopoulos (born 1956), former Greek footballer
Charalambos Xanthos, Greek Cypriot hotel and restaurant owner based in London, England
Charalambos Zouras (1885–1972), Greek athlete who competed in the 1908 Summer Olympics

See also
Saint Charalambos Church, Iași, Romanian Orthodox church located in Iași, Romania
Agios Charalambos, Thessaloniki village of the Langadas municipality
Haralamb (disambiguation)

Greek masculine given names